The 2018 AFC Cup group stage was played from 10 February to 16 May 2018. A total of 36 teams competed in the group stage to decide the 11 places in the knockout stage of the 2018 AFC Cup.

Draw

The draw for the group stage was held on 6 December 2017, 14:00 MYT (UTC+8), at the AFC House in Kuala Lumpur, Malaysia. The 36 teams were drawn into nine groups of four: three groups each in the West Asia Zone (Groups A–C) and the ASEAN Zone (Groups F–H), and one group each in the Central Asia Zone (Group D), the South Asia Zone (Group E), and the East Asia Zone (Group I). Teams from the same association in the West Asia Zone and ASEAN Zone could not be drawn into the same group.

The seeding of each team in the draw was determined by their association and their qualifying position within their association. The mechanism of the draw was as follows:
For the West Asia Zone, a draw was held for the five associations with two direct entrants (Iraq, Syria, Jordan, Bahrain, Lebanon) to determine the three associations occupying seeds 1 and 2, with seeds 1 placed in order for Groups A, B and C, and the two associations occupying seeds 3 and 4, with seeds 3 placed in order for Groups A and B. The remaining teams were then allocated to groups according to the rules set by AFC.
For the ASEAN Zone, a draw was held for the five associations with two direct entrants (Vietnam, Indonesia, Myanmar, Philippines, Singapore) to determine the three associations occupying seeds 1 and 2, with seeds 1 placed in order for Groups F, G and H, and the two associations occupying seeds 3 and 4, with seeds 3 placed in Groups F and G. The remaining teams were then allocated to the groups according to the rules set by AFC.
For the Central Asia Zone, the South Asia Zone, and the East Asia Zone, no draw was held, and the teams were allocated to the groups according to their association ranking published on 30 November 2016.

The following 36 teams entered into the group-stage draw, which included the 31 direct entrants and the five winners of the play-off round of the qualifying play-offs, whose identity was not known at the time of the draw.

Standby teams
 Al-Wehdat (for Al-Faisaly)
 Mohun Bagan (for Aizawl)
 Hà Nội (for FLC Thanh Hóa)
 Selangor (for Johor Darul Ta'zim)
 Madura United (for Bali United)
 Yadanarbon (for Shan United)
 Meralco Manila (for Ceres–Negros)
 Geylang International (for Tampines Rovers)

Format

In the group stage, each group was played on a home-and-away round-robin basis. The following teams advanced to the knockout stage:
The winners of each group and the best runners-up in the West Asia Zone and the ASEAN Zone advanced to the Zonal semi-finals.
The winners of each group in the Central Asia Zone, the South Asia Zone, and the East Asia Zone advanced to the Inter-zone play-off semi-finals.

Tiebreakers

The teams were ranked according to points (3 points for a win, 1 point for a draw, 0 points for a loss). If tied on points, tiebreakers were applied in the following order (Regulations Article 10.5):
Points in head-to-head matches among tied teams;
Goal difference in head-to-head matches among tied teams;
Goals scored in head-to-head matches among tied teams;
Away goals scored in head-to-head matches among tied teams;
If more than two teams are tied, and after applying all head-to-head criteria above, a subset of teams are still tied, all head-to-head criteria above are reapplied exclusively to this subset of teams;
Goal difference in all group matches;
Goals scored in all group matches;
Penalty shoot-out if only two teams are tied and they met in the last round of the group;
Disciplinary points (yellow card = 1 point, red card as a result of two yellow cards = 3 points, direct red card = 3 points, yellow card followed by direct red card = 4 points);
Team from the higher-ranked association.

Schedule
The schedule of each matchday was as follows (W: West Asia Zone; C: Central Asia Zone; S: South Asia Zone; A: ASEAN Zone; E: East Asia Zone).
Matches in the West Asia Zone were played on Mondays and Tuesdays (Matchdays 1–3: two groups on Monday, one group on Tuesday; Matchdays 4–6: one group on Monday, two groups on Tuesday).
Matches in the ASEAN Zone were played on Tuesdays and Wednesdays (Matchdays 1–3: two groups on Tuesday, one group on Wednesday; Matchdays 4–6: one group on Tuesday, two groups on Wednesday).
Matches in the Central Asia Zone, the South Asia Zone, and the East Asia Zone were played on Wednesdays; if two teams from the same association played at home on the same matchday, one match was moved to Tuesdays.

Groups

Group A

Group B

Group C

Group D

Group E

Group F

Group G

Group H

Group I

Ranking of second-placed teams

West Asia Zone

ASEAN Zone

Notes

References

External links
, the-AFC.com
AFC Cup 2018, stats.the-AFC.com

2
February 2018 sports events in Asia
March 2018 sports events in Asia
April 2018 sports events in Asia
May 2018 sports events in Asia